Callicladium is a monotypic genus of mosses belonging to the family Hypnaceae. The only species is Callicladium haldanianum.

The species was described by Howard Alvin Crum in 1971.

Synonyms for the species:
 Brachythecium weinmannii (Nees) Paris
 Heterophyllium sikokianum Sakurai
 Hypnum weinmannii Nees

References

Hypnales
Monotypic moss genera